John W. McCarty House is a historic home located at Candor in Tioga County, New York. It was built in 1850 and is an early expression of Italianate style architecture, with later Queen Anne style modifications.  The asymmetrically massed brick building consists of a two-story square shaped main block with a one-story rear wing.

It was listed on the National Register of Historic Places in 2001.

References

Houses on the National Register of Historic Places in New York (state)
Queen Anne architecture in New York (state)
Italianate architecture in New York (state)
Houses completed in 1850
Houses in Tioga County, New York
National Register of Historic Places in Tioga County, New York